Rosalba hovorei is a species of beetle in the family Cerambycidae. It was described by Touroult in 2007. It is known from Martinique.

References

Rosalba (beetle)
Beetles described in 2007